Autophila limbata is a moth of the family Noctuidae first described by Otto Staudinger in 1871. It is found in southern France, southern Italy, the Iberian Peninsula, Greece, the Crimea, the Near East, Iran, Transcaucasia and Turkmenistan.

There is one generation per year. Adults are on wing from May to July.

The larvae feed on Astragalus echinus and Onobrychis species.

Subspecies
Autophila limbata limbata
Autophila limbata lydia

External links

Fauna Europaea
Lepiforum e.V.

Toxocampina
Moths of Europe
Moths of Asia
Taxa named by Otto Staudinger